Grieg Hall is a 1,500 seat concert hall located on Edvard Griegs' square in Bergen, Norway.

Grieghallen was named in honor of Bergen-born composer Edvard Grieg, who served as music director of the Bergen Philharmonic Orchestra from 1880 until 1882. It serves as the home of the Bergen Philharmonic Orchestra. The building was designed in modernist architecture style by the Danish architect Knud Munk. Construction began in 1967 and was finished by May 1978.

Events
Grieghallen is used each year for a series of concerts, ballet and opera performances. The facility has featured symphonic, choir, jazz and pop music. Grieghallen is also a conference and exhibition center. Grieghallen has hosted seminars and lectures as well as national and international congresses.

It hosted the Eurovision Song Contest in 1986, and is the host of the annual Norwegian Brass Band Championship competition, which occurs in mid-winter. The recording studio is also known within the black metal community, as several of the more popular Norwegian black metal albums were recorded there, with Eirik Hundvin as sound technician.

References

External links
 
  

Buildings and structures in Bergen
Modernist architecture in Norway
1978 establishments in Norway
Tourist attractions in Bergen
Concert halls in Norway
Music venues in Bergen
Culture in Bergen
Edvard Grieg
Music venues completed in 1978